Claudette Elaine Johnson  (born 1959) is a British visual artist. She is known for her large-scale drawings of Black women and involvement with the BLK Art Group. She was described by Modern Art Oxford as "one of the most accomplished figurative artists working in Britain today".

Biography
Claudette Johnson was born in Manchester, UK. She studied Fine Art at Wolverhampton Polytechnic. While still a student there, she became a founder member of the BLK Art Group and took part in their second show at the Africa Centre, London, in 1983. Her talk, and seminar, at the First National Black Arts Conference in 1982 is recognised as a formative moment in the Black feminist art movement in the UK.

Johnson's work has featured in important group exhibitions such as Five Black Women at London's Africa Centre Gallery in 1983, Black Woman Time Now at Battersea Arts Centre in the same year, and The Thin Black Line at the ICA in London in 1986. Reviewing her 1992 solo exhibition In This Skin: Drawings by Claudette Johnson, at the Black Art Gallery, London, artist Steve McQueen (at the time a student at Goldsmiths College) wrote: "What she does is to bring out the soul, sensuality, dignity, and spirituality of the black woman....Claudette Johnson's work is rooted in her African heritage. Her talent is as powerful as it is obvious."

Lubaina Himid describes Johnson's work as "deeply sensuous" and "richly coloured". The artist calls the Black women in her drawings "monoliths, larger than life versions of women". Eddie Chambers notes: "These portraits were imposing pieces that demanded the viewer’s attention, as well as their respect."

In 2011, Johnson co-founded the BLK Arts Research Group with Marlene Smith and Keith Piper, to re-examine the BLK Arts Group's body of work and historical legacy. In 2012, two major projects were staged by this research group: a symposium with a retrospective exhibition entitled The Blk Art Group was held at the Graves Gallery, Sheffield, and an international conference entitled "Reframing the Moment" was held at the University of Wolverhampton. Her work was included in the Guildhall Art Gallery exhibition No Colour Bar: Black British Art in Action 1960–1990 (10 July 2015 – 24 January 2016).

Johnson had a solo exhibition at Hollybush Gardens, London (17 November 2017 – 22 December 2017), where a series of seven of her large-scale works on paper was presented, about which Frieze magazine said: "As a body of work, it possesses a profound and tender intimacy."

In 2019, her first major institutional exhibition since 1990 was held at Modern Art Oxford, the show being described as "an overview of one of the most accomplished figurative artists working in Britain today....her art sets out to redress negative portrayals of black men and women and to counter the invisibility of black people in cultural spheres and beyond." The reviewer for Art Fund wrote: "Intimate, powerful and sometimes deliberately uncomfortable, Claudette Johnson’s studies of black men and women demand attention and command respect." According to Apollo magazine: "While Johnson asserts that blackness is a fiction created by colonialism, she insists that this fiction 'can be interrupted by an encounter with the stories that we have to tell about ourselves'. Johnson’s subjects, by turns defiant and wary, funny and challenging, represent the varieties of stories that can be told by, in the artist’s words, 'Blackwoman presence.' As Johnson says, 'I’m interested in our humanity, our feelings and our politics.' Her art encapsulates all this in the tenderness and wilfulness of the individual human form."

Johnson's work is in the collections of the Tate London, Rugby Art Gallery, Arts Council England, Mappin Art Gallery, Manchester Art Gallery and Wolverhampton Art Gallery.

Johnson was appointed Member of the Order of the British Empire (MBE) in the 2022 New Year Honours for services to art.

Selected exhibitions
 1983: Five Black Women Artists. Africa Centre, London.
 1983: Black Women Time Now. Battersea Arts Centre London.
 1984: Into the Open: New Paintings Prints and Sculptures by Black Contemporary Artists. Mappin Art Gallery, Sheffield.
 1986: The Thin Black Line. Institute of Contemporary Arts, London.
 1987: The Image Employed: The Use of Narrative in Black Art. Corner-House, Manchester.
 1992: In This Skin: Drawings by Claudette Johnson. Black Art Gallery, London.
 1997: Transforming the Crown: African, Asian and Caribbean Artists in Britain 1966–1986. Royal Festival Hall, London, and The Caribbean Cultural Centre, The Studio Museum in Harlem and The Bronx Museum of the Arts, New York.
 2012: Thin Black Line(s). Tate Britain, London.
 2015–16: No Colour Bar: Black British Art in Action 1960–1990, Guildhall Art Gallery, London
 2017: Claudette Johnson, Hollybush Gardens, London 
 2019: Claudette Johnson: I Came to Dance, Modern Art Oxford (1 June – 8 September 2019)

References

Further reading
 Johnson, Claudette, Claudette Johnson: I Came to Dance, (Oxford, Modern Art Oxford, 2019) ISBN 9781999640422
 Brooks, Frederica, "Ancestral Links: The Art of Claudette Johnson" in Sulter, Maud (ed.), Passion: Discourses on Blackwomen's Creativity (Urban Fox Press, 1990), ISBN 1872124313
 Himid, Lubaina (ed.), Claudette Johnson: Pushing Back the Boundaries (Rochdale Art Galleries, Rochdale, 1990)
 Johnson, Claudette, "Issues Surrounding the Representation of the Naked Body of a Woman". FAN: Feminist Arts News 3 (1-10): 12–14.

External links
 Claudette Johnson in the Arts Council England collection
 A Claudette Johnson Study Day 2013, The Room Next to Mine by Marlene Smith
 "Claudette Johnson" at Diaspora Artists.
 "Claudette Johnson on three decades of her black feminist art and what has changed since the early 1980s", Creative Boom, 20 May 2019.
 Fisun Güner, "A Q&A with… Claudette Johnson, artist exploring black identity and representation", a-n.co.uk, 12 June 2019.
 "Artist of the Month: Claudette Johnson", Arts Council Collection, November 2018.
 "Claudette Johnson" at Hollybush Gardens.

1959 births
Living people
20th-century English painters
20th-century English women artists
21st-century English painters
21st-century English women artists
Alumni of the University of Wolverhampton
Artists from Manchester
Black British artists
English contemporary artists
Members of the Order of the British Empire